is a video game of the sports genre released in 2002 by Major A. It was released in America and Europe as International Superstar Soccer 2.

Reception
On release, Famitsu magazine scored the GameCube version of the game a 32 out of 40, and gave the PlayStation 2 version a 30 out of 40.

References

2002 video games
Xbox games
GameCube games
PlayStation 2 games
International Superstar Soccer
Japan-exclusive video games
Video games developed in Japan